Ophichthidae is a family of fish in the order Anguilliformes, commonly known as the snake eels. The term "Ophichthidae" comes from Greek ophis ("serpent") and ichthys ("fish"). Snake eels are also burrowing eels.  They are named for their physical appearance, as they have long, cylindrical, snake-like bodies. This family is found worldwide in tropical to warm temperate waters. They inhabit a wide range of habitats, from coastal shallows and even rivers, to depths below . Most species are bottom dwellers, hiding in mud or sand to capture their prey of crustaceans and small fish, but some are pelagic.

Many species lack fins altogether, improving their ability to burrow into the substrate like worms. They are often spotted or striped in colour, mimicking the appearance of venomous sea snakes to deter predators. Often, they are washed ashore by large storms.

Genera
Currently, 62 recognized genera are placed in this family:
Subfamily Myrophinae
 Ahlia Jordan & Davis, 1891
 Asarcenchelys McCosker, 1985
 Benthenchelys Fowler, 1934
 Glenoglossa McCosker, 1982
 Mixomyrophis McCosker, 1985
 Muraenichthys Bleeker, 1853
 Myrophis Lütken, 1852
 Neenchelys Bamber, 1915
 Pseudomyrophis Wade, 1946
 Pylorobranchus McCosker & Chen, 2012 
 Schismorhynchus McCosker, 1970
 Schultzidia Gosline, 1951
 Scolecenchelys Ogilby, 1897
 Skythrenchelys Castle & McCosker, 1999
 Sympenchelys Hibino, Ho & Kimura, 2015 
 Subfamily Ophichthinae
 Allips McCosker, 1972
 Aplatophis Böhlke, 1956
 Aprognathodon Böhlke, 1967
 Apterichtus Duméril, 1805
 Bascanichthys Jordan & Davis, 1891
 Brachysomophis Kaup, 1856
 Caecula Vahl, 1794
 Callechelys Kaup, 1856
 Caralophia Böhlke, 1955
 Chauligenion McCosker & Okamoto, 2016 
 Cirrhimuraena Kaup, 1856
 Cirricaecula Schultz, 1953
 Dalophis Rafinesque, 1810
 Echelus Rafinesque, 1810
 Echiophis Kaup, 1856
 Ethadophis Rosenblatt & McCosker, 1970
 Evips McCosker, 1972
 Gordiichthys Jordan & Davis, 1891
 Hemerorhinus Weber & de Beaufort, 1916
 Herpetoichthys Kaup, 1856
 Hyphalophis McCosker & Böhlke, 1982
 Ichthyapus Brisout de Barneville, 1847
 Kertomichthys McCosker & Böhlke, 1982
 Lamnostoma Kaup, 1856
 Leiuranus Bleeker, 1852
 Leptenchelys Myers & Wade, 1941
 Letharchus Goode & Bean, 1882
 Lethogoleos McCosker & Böhlke, 1982
 Leuropharus Rosenblatt & McCosker, 1970
 Luthulenchelys McCosker, 2007
 Malvoliophis Whitley, 1934
 Myrichthys Girard, 1859 
 Mystriophis Kaup, 1856
 Ophichthus Ahl, 1789
 Ophisurus Lacépède, 1800
 Paraletharchus McCosker, 1974
 Phaenomonas Myers & Wade, 1941
 Phyllophichthus Gosline, 1951
 Pisodonophis Kaup, 1856
 Quassiremus Jordan & Davis, 1891
 Rhinophichthus McCosker, 1999
 Scytalichthys Jordan & Davis, 1891
 Stictorhinus Böhlke & McCosker, 1975
 Suculentophichthus Fricke, Golani & Appelbaum-Golani, 2015 
 Xestochilus McCosker, 1998
 Xyrias Jordan & Snyder, 1901
 Yirrkala Whitley, 1940

References

 
Eels
Ray-finned fish families
Marine fish families
Extant Eocene first appearances
Taxa named by Albert Günther